The 1972 Australian Open was a tennis tournament played on grass courts at the Kooyong Lawn Tennis Club in Melbourne in Australia and was held from 26 December 1971 to 3 January 1972.  It was the 60th edition of the Australian Open and the first Grand Slam of the year.

Finals

Men's singles

 Ken Rosewall defeated  Malcolm Anderson 7–6(7–2), 6–3, 7–5  
 It was Rosewall's 16th career Grand Slam title (his 8th in singles) and his 6th Australian title.

Women's singles

 Virginia Wade defeated  Evonne Goolagong 6–4, 6–4  
 It was Wade's 2nd career Grand Slam title and her 1st Australian title.

Men's doubles

 Owen Davidson /  Ken Rosewall defeated  Ross Case /  Geoff Masters 3–6, 7–6, 6–3  
 It was Davidson's 1st career Grand Slam title and his only Australian title. It was Rosewall's 17th career Grand Slam title and his 7th and last Australian title.

Women's doubles

 Helen Gourlay /  Kerry Harris defeated  Patricia Coleman /  Karen Krantzcke 6–0, 6–4  
 It was Gourlay's 1st career Grand Slam title and her 1st Australian title. It was Harris' only career Grand Slam title and her only Australian title.

Mixed doubles
Competition not held between 1970 and 1986.

References

External links
 Australian Open official website

 
 

 
1972 in Australian tennis
1971 in Australian tennis
December 1971 sports events in Australia
January 1972 sports events in Australia
1972,Australian Open